The Infracombe Slates Group is a geologic group in England. It preserves fossils dating back to the Devonian period.

See also

 List of fossiliferous stratigraphic units in England

References
 

Geological groups of the United Kingdom
Geologic formations of England
Devonian System of Europe
Devonian England
Slate formations